Acromantini is a tribe of mantis in the family Hymenopodidae, which contains 9 genera and 35 species:

Acromantis (Saussure, 1870)
Acromantis australis (Saussure, 1871)
Acromantis dyaka (Hebard, 1920)
Acromantis elegans (Lombardo, 1993)
Acromantis formosana (Shiraki, 1911)
Acromantis gestri (Giglio-Tos, 1915)
Acromantis grandis (Beier, 1930)
Acromantis hesione (Stal, 1877)
Acromantis indica (Giglio-Tos, 1915)
Acromantis insularis (Giglio-Tos, 1915)
Acromantis japonica (Westwood, 1889)
Acromantis lilii (Werner, 1922)
Acromantis luzonica (Hebard, 1920)
Acromantis montana (Giglio-Tos, 1915)
Acromantis moultoni (Giglio-Tos, 1915)
Acromantis nicobarica (Mukherjee, 1995)
Acromantis oligoneura (Haan, 1942)
Acromantis palauana (Beier, 1972)
Acromantis philippina (Beier, 1966)
Acromantis satsumensis (Matsumura, 1913)
Acromantis siporana (Giglio-Tos, 1915)
Ambivia Stal, 1877
Ambivia parapopa Wang, 1993
Ambivia popa Stal, 1877
Citharomantis (Rehn, 1909)
Citharomantis falcata (Rehn, 1909)
Majangella Giglio-Tos, 1915
Majangella carli Giglio-Tos, 1915
Majangella moultoni Giglio-Tos, 1915
Majangella ophirensis Werner, 1922
Metacromantis (Beier, 1930)
Metacromantis nigrofemorata (Ghate, Thulsi Ra, Maqsood Javed & Roy, 2006)
Metacromantis oxyops (Beier, 1930)
Oligomantis (Giglio-Tos, 1915)
Oligomantis hyalina (Werner, 1916)
Oligomantis mentaweiana (Giglio-Tos, 1915)
Oligomantis orientalis (Giglio-Tos, 1915)
Parapsychomantis Shcherbakov, 2017
Parapsychomantis vietnamensis Shcherbakov, 2017
Psychomantis (Giglio-Tos, 1915)
Psychomantis borneensis (Haan, 1842)
Psychomantis malayensis (Beier, 1931)
Rhomantis (Giglio-Tos, 1915)
Rhomantis moultoni (Giglio-Tos)

See also
List of mantis genera and species

References

Hymenopodidae